Frank Anthony Seurer (born August 16, 1962) is a former professional American football quarterback.

He played collegiate football at the University of Kansas. He played for the Los Angeles Express (USFL) in 1984 and 1985 seasons. He was selected by the Seattle Seahawks in the 1984 NFL Supplemental Draft of USFL and CFL Players. Seurer started two games at quarterback for the Kansas City Chiefs in the 1987 NFL season following the 1987 NFLPA strike.

References

1962 births
Living people
American football quarterbacks
Kansas City Chiefs players
Kansas Jayhawks football players
Sportspeople from Huntington Beach, California
Players of American football from California
Los Angeles Express players